Eva Birnerová and Jarmila Gajdošová are the defending champions but only Eva Birnerová participated this year.

Eva Birnerová partnered Caroline Wozniacki, but they lost in quarterfinals to Anabel Medina Garrigues and Virginia Ruano Pascual.

Seeds

  Anabel Medina Garrigues /  Virginia Ruano Pascual (champions)
  Vera Dushevina /  Elena Vesnina (semifinals)
  Nathalie Dechy /  Émilie Loit (quarterfinals)
  Anna-Lena Grönefeld /  Tatjana Malek (quarterfinals)

Draw

Doubles draw

External links
Draws

Nordea Nordic Light Open
Doubles 2007
Nordic